Vajna is a surname. Notable people with the surname include:

Andrew G. Vajna (1944–2019), Hungarian-American film producer
Gábor Vajna (1891–1946), Hungarian politician

See also
Vajda
Vanna

Hungarian-language surnames